Hillel Roman (הלל רומן) is a visual artist living and working in Tel Aviv, Israel.

Biography

Roman was born on April 16, 1975 in Los Angeles, California. At age 24 he joined Hamidrasha Art School, Beit Berl College, Israel. In 2004 Roman graduated from Tel-Aviv University, the Department for Poetics and Comparative Literature (magna cum laude), and in 2007 he received his Masters of Fine Arts from Goldsmiths College, University of London.

Roman employs a wide range of techniques, from drawing, painting and conceptual art, through sculpting and etching, to building fully functional astronomical observatories. 

After his graduation from Beit Berl college, he assumed a teaching position there, and in the years 2004-2006 he lectured at Avni Institute of Art and Design in Tel Aviv. After having returned from his studies in London, he resumed his position at Beit Berl, and also accepted a teaching role at Thelma Yellin school of Fine Arts.

In 2007, Roman received a residency grant at Cite Internationale des Arts, Paris, France. In 2009, he won the Young Artist Prize from the Ministry of culture, Israel. The judging committee said about him: "Roman's paintings, drawings and etchings, always beautiful and saturated... more than intending to delegate a (renewed) birth of beauty out of the banal, replicated and ordinary, they wish to confront the postmodern spectator with the question 'what is modern painting'..."

In an interview with curator Orit Bulgaro in the catalog of Idiolect, an exhibition at the Bat Yam Museum of Contemporary Art in 2009, Roman discussed "...the significance of the concrete versus the metaphorical, the human desire to get through the metaphor and to touch, the vain struggle to bridge the distance between the eye and the hand. Maybe that is the privilege of the painter/sculptor, and the source of his relevance, despite it all. In any case, I try to create objects or paintings that exist in that chasm between the concrete and the metaphorical; perhaps that is my way of trying to avoid filling any role."

Solo exhibitions

2009  Kingdom, Bat-Yam Museum of Art, curator: Orit Bulgaro
2009  Observatory, 2nd Herzliya Biennial, curators: Picnic Magazine
2006  Stronghold, Tel Aviv Artists' Studios
2005  Occasional Goods, Dvir Gallery, Tel Aviv
2002  Darkling, Dvir Gallery, Tel Aviv

Group Shows

2009  The rings of Saturn, Dvir Gallery, Tel-Aviv
2009  Flakes, Center for Contemporary Art Tel-Aviv, Curator: Efrat Gal
2009  Hulululu, P8 Gallery, Tel-Aviv, Curator: Rakefet Wiener-Omer
2008  Neues Sehen - Young Art from Israel, Städtische Galerie Bremen, Germany (catalog)
2008  Ksharim ve'Heksherim (connections and contexts) from the Beno Kalev collection, Tefen Museum of Art (catalog)
2008  Visits to (Some)Where: Recent Art from Israel (& Poland), Galeria BWA Zielona-Gora Poland, Curator: Adi Englman
2007  Reshamim III The Third Jerusalem Drawing Biennial, curator: Dalia Manor (catalog)
2007  Digital Landscapes, Curator: Irit Tal, Tel-Aviv University Gallery (catalog)
2007  Come Thou Beauty, Haifa University gallery, Curator: Ruti Direktor (catalog)
2004  Art for an Alternative Society, Markaz al-Baqaa, Jaffa
2004  Rose c'est la vie – On Flowers in Contemporary Art, Tel-Aviv Museum of Art, Curator: Edna Moshenson (catalog)
2004  A Point of View Tel-Aviv Museum of Art, Curator: Ellen Ginton (catalog)
2003  Young Israeli Art - The Jacques and Eugenie O'Hana Collection, Tel-Aviv Museum of Art (catalog)
2003  Realism and a Diagonal – Eldar Farber and Hillel Roman Guest Artist Gallery, Hamidrasha Art School, Curator: Jacob Mishori
2003  A Stage against the War – Artists against the war in Iraq, Markaz al-Baqaa Jaffa
2003  Group Exhibition, Dvir Gallery, Tel Aviv
2003  Hamidrasha Gallery, Tel Aviv, Curator: Doron Rabina
2002  Imagine - Artists for co-existence, Umm El Fahim Art Gallery
2002  Two plus Two, Pyramid Center for Contemporary Art, Haifa, Curator: Philip Renzer

References

External links
Artist's website
Dvir Gallery, Artist's page
Artis - Israeli Art
Come Thou Beauty, Haifa University Art Gallery

21st-century Israeli artists
Jewish artists
Israeli painters
Israeli sculptors
1975 births
Living people
Alumni of Goldsmiths, University of London
HaMidrasha – Faculty of the Arts alumni